The Nether Poppleton Tithe Barn is a tithe barn at Manor Farm in the village of Nether Poppleton in the unitary authority of City of York in the North of England. Research by dendrochronologists has shown that the tithe barn, which was built on the site of an old nunnery, is at least 450 years old. 

The building is often referred to as "Rupert's Barn" because Prince Rupert of the Rhine is said to have stationed part of his army in the barn before the Battle of Marston Moor in 1644 during the English Civil War. There is also an historical connection with the Restoration of King Charles II because in 1660, Lord Fairfax and two hundred Yorkshire gentlemen gathered at the barn before marching into York for the proclamation of the restored King.

The area surrounding the barn forms part of a scheduled monument and after nearby St Everilda's Church, the tithe barn is the oldest, largest and most important building in both Poppletons.

The Friends of the Poppleton Tithe Barn (registered charity  number 1060767) was founded in 1997 to preserve and maintain the Tithe Barn for the benefit of the local community and future generations. It was restored in 1999 and completed in the year 2000. The Duke of York visited the Barn in 1999 whilst it was being restored.

Designed and Built by Hutton Peach, the new Poppleton Tithe Barn website was launched in August 2016.

References

External links
 Poppleton Tithe Barn.
 Register of Charities entry for Friends of the Poppleton Tithe Barn.
 Historic England Schedule of Monuments entry.
 Photo of Nether Poppleton Tithe Barn on geograph.org.uk

Grade II listed buildings in York
Scheduled monuments in York
Barns in England
Tithe barns in Europe